Sanjay Yadav, also known as Ramsingh Sonu Yadav, is a young and talented cricketer from India. Born on 11 November 1999 in Gorakhpur, Uttar Pradesh, he is currently 23 years old and stands at a height of 5.11 feet (1.80 m). Sanjay has made a name for himself in the cricketing world and is considered one of the rising stars in Indian cricket.

Sonu Yadav (born 11 November 1999) is an Indian cricketer.

Sonu Yadav Education 
Sanjay's family moved to Hosur, an industrial city in Tamil Nadu, in 2000 when he was 5 years old in quest of better employment possibilities. Up until 2010, he attended Maharishi Vidya Mandir School, then for the remainder of his education, he attended R V Govt Boys High Sec School in Hosur where he completed his secondary education.

Sonu Yadav Career 
He made his Twenty20 debut on 10 January 2021, for Tamil Nadu in the 2020–21 Syed Mushtaq Ali Trophy. He made his List A debut on 20 February 2021, for Tamil Nadu in the 2020–21 Vijay Hazare Trophy.

Now He was bought by Royal Challengers Bangalore for IPL 2023 at price 20 Lakh Indian Rupees. He wll playing for Royal Challengers Bangalore in IPL 2023.

References

External links
 

1999 births
Living people
Indian cricketers
Tamil Nadu cricketers
Place of birth missing (living people)